Mona Ratuliu (born January 31, 1982 in Jakarta) is an Indonesian actress and presenter. She appeared in the soap operas Lupus Milenia and Pelangi Di Matamu. She is a graduate of the Faculty of Graphic Design of Tarumanegara University.

Career
Ratuliu began her career as an actress in the soap opera Hati Yang Perawan on ANTV. She gained more fame from her work in Pelangi Dimatamu. She has also appeared in other shows such as Bunga Kasih Sayang, Hikayah, and Dewa. Film appearances include Ekskul and Rahasia Bintang. Ekskul won the Citra Award for Best Film at the 2006 Indonesian Film Festival.

Personal life
Ratuliu was born on January 31, 1982, in Jakarta. She is the second child of Albert Frederick Ratuliu and Neng Dedeh Sumiati. She married Indra Brasco, an actor and businessman, on September 14, 2002. They have four children.

Filmography

Film

Television

TV commercials
 Extraderm
 Akari
 Blue Beach

References

1982 births
Indonesian actresses
Indonesian television presenters
Minahasa people
People from Jakarta
Living people
Indonesian women television presenters
Tarumanagara University alumni